The Message Understanding Conferences (MUC) for computing and computer science,  were initiated and financed by DARPA (Defense Advanced Research Projects Agency) to encourage the development of new and better methods of information extraction. The character of this competition, many concurrent research teams competing against one another—required the development of standards for evaluation, e.g. the adoption of metrics like precision and recall.

Topics and exercises 
Only for the first conference (MUC-1) could the participant choose the output format for the extracted
information. From the second conference the output format, by which the participants'
systems would be evaluated, was prescribed. For each topic fields were given, which had to be
filled with information
from the text. Typical fields were, for example, the cause, the agent, the time and place of an event,
the consequences etc. The number of fields increased from conference to conference.

At the sixth conference (MUC-6) the task of recognition of named entities and coreference was added.
For named entity all phrases in the text were supposed to be marked as person, location, organization,
time or quantity.

The topics and text sources, which were processed, show a continuous move from military to civil themes, which mirrored
the change in business interest in information extraction taking place at the time.

Literature 
 Ralph Grishman, Beth Sundheim: Message Understanding Conference - 6: A Brief History. In: Proceedings of the 16th International Conference on Computational Linguistics (COLING), I, Copenhagen, 1996, 466–471.

See also
 DARPA TIPSTER Program

External links 
 MUC-7
 MUC-6
 SAIC Information Extraction

MUC